Tapellaria is a genus of leaf-dwelling lichens in the family Pilocarpaceae. The genus was circumscribed by lichenologist Johannes Müller Argoviensis in 1890, with Tapellaria herpetospora assigned as the type species.

Species
Tapellaria albomarginata 
Tapellaria bilimbioides 
Tapellaria corticola 
Tapellaria epiphylla 
Tapellaria floridensis 
Tapellaria gilva 
Tapellaria granulosa 
Tapellaria herpetospora 
Tapellaria intermedia 
Tapellaria isidiata  – Cameroon
Tapellaria leonorae 
Tapellaria major 
Tapellaria malmei 
Tapellaria marcellae 
Tapellaria moelleri 
Tapellaria nana 
Tapellaria nigrata 
Tapellaria palaeotropica 
Tapellaria parvimuriformis 
Tapellaria phyllophila 
Tapellaria puiggarii 
Tapellaria samoana 
Tapellaria saxicola 
Tapellaria schindleri 
Tapellaria similis

References

Pilocarpaceae
Lichen genera
Taxa described in 1890
Taxa named by Johannes Müller Argoviensis
Lecanorales genera